Farm to Market Roads in Texas are owned and maintained by the Texas Department of Transportation (TxDOT).

FM 3100

Farm to Market Road 3100 (FM 3100) is located in Brown County. The road begins at FM 1467 northeast of Owens, and continues south until meeting with US 377 in Early. FM 3100 was designated on June 2, 1967, from US 67 north  to a road intersection at Salt Creek Church. On August 29, 1989, FM 3100 was extended north  to a county road. On October 29, 1992, it was extended north to FM 1467.

FM 3101

FM 3102

FM 3103

FM 3104

FM 3105

FM 3106

FM 3106 (1967)

The original FM 3106 was designated on June 2, 1967, from US 77 at Bluff Dale south  to Richardson Creek. On September 5, 1973, the road was extended south  to FM 2157 (now FM 205). By district request, FM 3106 was cancelled on December 20, 1984, and transferred to FM 2481.

FM 3107

FM 3108

FM 3109

FM 3110

FM 3111

FM 3112

FM 3113

FM 3114

FM 3115

FM 3116

FM 3117

FM 3118

FM 3119

FM 3120

FM 3120 (1967)

The original FM 3120 was designated on June 1, 1967, from FM 364, 0.8 miles south of SH 105, north and northwest  to Willis Lane and Tram Road. On October 15, 1976, a  section from SH 105 south was transferred to FM 364. The remainder of FM 3120 was also transferred to FM 364 on June 9, 1983.

FM 3121

FM 3122

FM 3123

FM 3124

FM 3125

Farm to Market Road 3125 (FM 3125) is located in Bailey County. It runs from the New Mexico state line to FM 1731.

FM 3125 was designated on July 9, 1970, on the current route as a replacement of a section of FM 1760, which was rerouted on a different road further south.

FM 3125 (1967)

The original FM 3125 was designated on August 31, 1967, from FM 692 west and southwest  to a proposed road intersection. On July 11, 1968, the road was extended southwest  to SH 87. FM 3125 was cancelled on February 17, 1969, and became a portion of FM 255 (now RE 255).

FM 3126

FM 3127

FM 3128

FM 3129

RM 3130

FM 3131

FM 3132

FM 3133

Farm to Market Road 3133 (FM 3133) is located in Grayson and Collin counties.

FM 3133 begins at an intersection with SH 5 in Van Alstyne. The highway travels in an eastern and southward direction through rural farming areas, ending at an intersection with FM 2862 in Westminster.

The highway was extended, replacing all of FM 3093 to FM 2862 on May 7, 1974.

FM 3134

FM 3135

FM 3136

RM 3137

FM 3138

FM 3139

FM 3140

FM 3141

FM 3142

FM 3142 (1968)

FM 3142 was cancelled on November 3, 1972, and became a portion of FM 1223, although the route remained signed as FM 3142 until construction was completed.

FM 3143

FM 3144

FM 3145

FM 3146
Farm to Market Road 3146 (FM 3146) is a designation that has been applied to two different highways. No highway presently carries the FM 3146 designation.

FM 3146 (1968)

FM 3146 was first designated on July 11, 1968, from FM Spur 221 at Shive southwest to a road intersection. This was cancelled by 1970.

FM 3146 (1970)

FM 3146 was designated on May 7, 1970, from SH 36 southward, eastward, and southward . On November 3, 1972, FM 3146 was extended south to FM 2287. FM 3146 was cancelled on March 15, 1990, and mileage was transferred to FM 2287.

FM 3147

FM 3148

FM 3149

FM 3150

FM 3151

Farm to Market Road 3151 (FM 3151) is located in southwestern Houston County.

FM 3151 begins at FM 230 between Weldon and Lovelady. The two-lane,  road travels northward before terminating in Pearson's Chapel at FM 1280 between Austonio and Lovelady.

FM 3151 was designated along its current alignment on July 11, 1968.

FM 3152

FM 3153

FM 3154

FM 3155

Farm to Market Road 3155 (FM 3155) is located in Fort Bend County. The highway begins at U.S. Route 90 Alternate in Richmond and follows streets north and northwest before ending at the Richmond State Supported Living Center.

FM 3155 begins at the junction of US 90A and Collins Road in Richmond. The Oak Bend Medical Center is on the south side of the intersection. FM 3155 heads northwest on Collins Road, crossing the Union Pacific Railroad tracks. At Preston Street, FM 3155 turns sharply west for a few blocks then curves to the northwest.

FM 3156

Farm to Market Road 3156 (FM 3156) is located in Matagorda County.

At that point, it becomes County Road 112 and continues to FM 1728 at Ashwood.

FM 3157

FM 3158

FM 3159

Farm to Market Road 3159 (FM 3159) is located in Comal County.

FM 3159 begins at an intersection with SH 46/Smithson Valley Road east of Bulverde. The highway travels in a northeast direction, entering Canyon Lake at an intersection with FM 311. FM 3159 travels through more rural areas of the CDP, with the route becoming more suburban north of Cranes Mill Road. The highway continues to travel through more suburban and commercial areas, ending at an intersection with FM 2673 in the Startzville area of Canyon Lake.

The highway was extended  southwestward to FM 311 on November 26, 1969. FM 3159 was extended  to SH 46 on May 7, 1970.

Junction list

RM 3160

Ranch to Market Road 3160 (RM 3160) was located in Kendall County.

The highway was extended  southward on May 7, 1970. RM 3160 was extended  southward to RM 475 (now SH 46) at Bergheim on November 3, 1972. The highway was extended  southwestward to the Comal County line on September 29, 1977; this section was later cancelled on November 19, 1979. RM 3160 was cancelled on May 25, 1993, with the mileage being transferred to FM 3351.

FM 3161

Farm to Market Road 3161 (FM 3161) is located in Wilson County.

FM 3161 begins at an intersection with FM 2505. The highway travels in a northeast direction, running in a more northern direction at County Road 134. FM 3161 continues to run in a mostly northern direction, ending at an intersection with SH 97 southeast of Floresville.

FM 3161 was designated on August 5, 1968, along its current route, with the mileage being transferred from FM 2505.

FM 3162

FM 3163

FM 3164

FM 3164 (1968)

The original FM 3164 was designated on July 11, 1968, from FM 55 southwest  to Wolf Creek Park at Navarro Mill Reservoir. FM 3164 was cancelled on September 16, 1971, and became a portion of FM 639.

FM 3165

RM 3166

Ranch to Market Road 3166 (RM 3166) is located in Terrell County. The route travels east for  before state maintenance ends.

RM 3166 was established on November 26, 1969, along its current route.

FM 3167

FM 3168

FM 3169

Farm to Market Road 3169 (FM 3169) is located in Zapata County.

The western terminus of FM 3169 is in San Ygnacio at US 83. The route travels through rural Zapata County. The state designation and maintenance of the road ends approximately 17 miles northeast of San Ygnacio.

FM 3169 was extended east  on May 7, 1970, northeast  on November 5, 1971, northeast  on November 3, 1972,  on May 25, 1976, and finally  April 30, 1987. The 6.5 mile extension has not been constructed yet.

FM 3170

FM 3171

FM 3172

FM 3173

FM 3174

FM 3175

FM 3176

FM 3177

Farm to Market Road 3177 (FM 3177) is a  divided roadway located in Travis County. It begins at FM 969 in Austin, heading northeast on Decker Lane, a four-lane divided highway. It passes the Travis County Exposition Center which contains Luedecke Arena, to the east, and runs to the west of Lake Walter E. Long. FM 3177 crosses a Capital Metropolitan Transportation Authority line and reaches its northern terminus at an intersection with US 290.

FM 3177 was designated oon November 26, 1969, along the current route. On June 27, 1995, the entire route was redesignated Urban Road 3177 (UR 3177). The designation reverted to FM 3177 with the elimination of the Urban Road system on November 15, 2018.

FM 3178

FM 3179

FM 3180

FM 3181

FM 3182

FM 3183

FM 3184

FM 3184 (1969)

The original FM 3184 was designated on November 26, 1969, from the Wharton County line south  to FM 1468 near Clemville. FM 3184 was cancelled on September 13, 1974, and became a portion of FM 1162.

FM 3185

FM 3186

FM 3187

FM 3188

FM 3189

Farm to Market Road 3189 (FM 3189) was located in Williamson County.

The highway was cancelled on May 24, 1985, with the mileage being transferred to FM 2843.

FM 3190

FM 3191

FM 3192

FM 3193

FM 3194

FM 3195

Farm to Market Road 3195 (FM 3195) is located in Cameron County.

FM 3195 begins at a junction with I-2/US 83 in western Harlingen. The highway travels in a northern direction along Stuart Place Road through suburban areas of the city. Near the Stuart Place Country Club, FM 3195 enters Palm Valley, then ends at an intersection with FM 2994.

FM 3195 was designated on May 7, 1970, along its current route. The route was redesignated Urban Road 3195 (UR 3195) on June 27, 1995. The designation reverted to FM 3195 with the elimination of the Urban Road system on November 15, 2018.

FM 3196

FM 3197

FM 3197 (1970)

The original FM 3197 was designated on May 7, 1970, from a point north of FM 2812 south  to FM 1925, 1.3 miles east of FM 907. FM 3197 was cancelled on November 5, 1971, and removed from the highway system in exchange for creation of FM 3250.

FM 3198

Farm to Market Road 3198 (FM 3198) is located in Cherokee County.

FM 3198 was designated on March 1, 1972, along the current route.

FM 3198 (1970)

The highway was cancelled and removed from the state highway system on November 5, 1971, in exchange for the creation of FM 3251 (now FM 1425).

FM 3199

References

+31
Farm to market roads 3100
Farm to Market Roads 3100